Sophie Vercruysse is a film editor with, by 2022, more than thirty film credits. She received a Magritte Award for Best Editing for her work in Our Children (2012). Her editing credits also include Private Property (2006), Private Lessons (2008), The White Knights (2015), Baden Baden (2016), Souvenir (2016), Madly in Life (2020), and Our Men (2021).

References

External links

Belgian film editors
Living people
Magritte Award winners
Year of birth missing (living people)